The ekkalam is an aerophone instrument mainly used in Tamil Nadu, India. It consists of a large brass tube with one end having a bell. This instrument produces sound by vibration of air injected by the player, altering the pitch by changing the lip tension and the power of air flow. It is played in temple festivals or celebrations. Most of the sound produced travels straight outward from the bell. It is played along with a drum or another ekkalam.

References
 Premalatha, V. (1985) Music Through the Ages. Sundeep Prakashan. 

Aerophones
Indian musical instruments